Newsweek is an American weekly news magazine co-owned 50 percent each by Dev Pragad, its president and CEO, and Johnathan Davis, who has no operational role at Newsweek. Founded as a weekly print magazine in 1933, it was widely distributed during the 20th century, and had many notable editors-in-chief. The magazine was acquired by The Washington Post Company in 1961, and remained under its ownership until 2010.

Revenue declines prompted The Washington Post Company to sell it, in August 2010, to the audio pioneer Sidney Harman for a purchase price of one dollar and an assumption of the magazine's liabilities. Later that year, Newsweek merged with the news and opinion website The Daily Beast, forming The Newsweek Daily Beast Company. Newsweek was jointly owned by the estate of Harman and the diversified American media and Internet company IAC. Newsweek continued to experience financial difficulties, which led to the cessation of print publication and a transition to an all-digital format at the end of 2012.

In 2013, IBT Media acquired Newsweek from IAC; the acquisition included the Newsweek brand and its online publication, but did not include The Daily Beast. IBT Media, which also owns the International Business Times, rebranded itself as Newsweek Media Group, and in 2014, relaunched Newsweek in both print and digital form. 

In 2018, IBT Media split into two companies, Newsweek Publishing and IBT Media. The split was accomplished one day before the District Attorney of Manhattan indicted Etienne Uzac, the co-owner of IBT Media, on fraud charges. 

Under Newsweek'''s current co-owner and CEO, Dev Pragad, it is both profitable, with revenue of $60 million, and also growing: between May 2019 and May 2022, its monthly unique visitors increased from about 30 million to 48 million, according to Comscore.

History

Founding and early years (1933–1961)
thumb|right|May 8, 1944 WWII "Armed Forces Overseas Edition"News-Week was launched in 1933 by Thomas J. C. Martyn, a former foreign-news editor for Time. He obtained financial backing from a group of U.S. stockholders "which included Ward Cheney, of the Cheney silk family, John Hay Whitney, and Paul Mellon, son of Andrew W. Mellon". Paul Mellon's ownership in News-Week apparently represented "the first attempt of the Mellon family to function journalistically on a national scale". The group of original owners invested around million (equivalent to $million in ). Other large stockholders prior to 1946 were public utilities investment banker Stanley Childs and Wall Street corporate lawyer Wilton Lloyd-Smith.

Journalist Samuel T. Williamson served as the first editor-in-chief of News-Week. The first issue of the magazine was dated February 17, 1933. Seven photographs from the week's news were printed on the first issue's cover.

In 1937, News-Week merged with the weekly journal Today, which had been founded in 1932 by future New York Governor and diplomat W. Averell Harriman, and Vincent Astor of the prominent Astor family. As a result of the deal, Harriman and Astor provided $600,000 in venture capital funds and Vincent Astor became both the chairman of the board and its principal stockholder between 1937 and his death in 1959.

In 1937, Malcolm Muir took over as president and editor-in-chief. He changed the name to Newsweek, emphasized interpretive stories, introduced signed columns, and launched international editions.

Under Post ownership (1961–2010)
The magazine was purchased by The Washington Post Company in 1961.

Osborn Elliott was named editor of Newsweek in 1961 and became the editor-in-chief in 1969.

In 1970, Eleanor Holmes Norton represented sixty female employees of Newsweek who had filed a claim with the Equal Employment Opportunity Commission that Newsweek had a policy of allowing only men to be reporters. The women won, and Newsweek agreed to allow women to be reporters. The day the claim was filed, Newsweek cover article was "Women in Revolt", covering the feminist movement; the article was written by a woman who had been hired on a freelance basis since there were no female reporters at the magazine.

Edward Kosner became editor from 1975 to 1979 after directing the magazine's extensive coverage of the Watergate scandal that led to the resignation of President Richard Nixon in 1974.

Richard M. Smith became chairman in 1998, the year that the magazine inaugurated its "Best High Schools in America" list, a ranking of public secondary schools based on the Challenge Index, which measures the ratio of Advanced Placement or International Baccalaureate exams taken by students to the number of graduating students that year, regardless of the scores earned by students or the difficulty in graduating. Schools with average SAT scores above 1300 or average ACT scores above 27 are excluded from the list; these are categorized instead as "Public Elite" High Schools. In 2008, there were 17 Public Elites.

Smith resigned as board chairman in December 2007.

Restructuring and new owner (2008–2010)

During 2008–2009, Newsweek undertook a dramatic business restructuring. Citing difficulties in competing with online news sources to provide unique news in a weekly publication, the magazine refocused its content on opinion and commentary beginning with its May 24, 2009, issue. It shrank its subscriber rate base, from 3.1million to 2.6million in early 2008, to 1.9million in July 2009 and then to 1.5million in January 2010a decline of 50% in one year. Jon Meacham, Editor-in-chief from 2006 to 2010, described his strategy as "counterintuitive" as it involved discouraging renewals and nearly doubling subscription prices as it sought a more affluent subscriber base for its advertisers. During this period, the magazine also laid off staff. While advertising revenues were down almost 50% compared to the prior year, expenses were also diminished, whereby the publishers hoped Newsweek would return to profitability.

The financial results for 2009 as reported by The Washington Post Company showed that advertising revenue for Newsweek was down 37% in 2009 and the magazine division reported an operating loss for 2009 of million (equivalent to $ million in ) compared to a loss of million in 2008 (equivalent to $ million in ). During the first quarter of 2010, the magazine lost nearly million (equivalent to $ million in ).

By May 2010, Newsweek had been losing money for the past two years and was put up for sale. The sale attracted international bidders. One bidder was Syrian entrepreneur Abdulsalam Haykal, CEO of Syrian publishing company Haykal Media, who brought together a coalition of Middle Eastern investors with his company. Haykal later claimed his bid was ignored by Newsweek bankers, Allen & Co.

Harman's bid was accepted over three competitors. Meacham left the magazine upon completion of the sale. Sidney Harman, a major contributor to Zionist causes, was the husband of Jane Harman, at that time a member of Congress from California.

Merger with The Daily Beast (2010–2013)

At the end of 2010, Newsweek merged with the online publication The Daily Beast, following extensive negotiations between the respective proprietors. Tina Brown, The Daily Beast editor-in-chief, became editor of both publications. The new entity, The Newsweek Daily Beast Company, was 50% owned by IAC/InterActiveCorp and 50% by Harman.

Redesign (2011)Newsweek was redesigned in March 2011. The new Newsweek moved the "Perspectives" section to the front of the magazine, where it served essentially as a highlight reel of the past week on The Daily Beast. More room was made available in the front of the magazine for columnists, editors, and special guests. A new "News Gallery" section featured two-page spreads of photographs from the week with a brief article accompanying each one. The "NewsBeast" section featured short articles, a brief interview with a newsmaker, and several graphs and charts for quick reading in the style of The Daily Beast. This is where the Newsweek staple "Conventional Wisdom" was located. Brown retained Newsweek focus on in-depth, analytical features and original reporting on politics and world affairs, as well as a new focus on longer fashion and pop culture features. A larger culture section named "Omnivore" featured art, music, books, film, theater, food, travel, and television, including a weekly "Books" and "Want" section. The back page was reserved for a "My Favorite Mistake" column written by celebrity guest columnists about a mistake they made that helped shape who they are.

Cessation of print format (2012)

On July 25, 2012, the company operating Newsweek indicated the publication was likely to go digital to cover its losses and could undergo other changes by the next year. Barry Diller, chairman of the conglomerate IAC/InterActiveCorp, said his firm was looking at options since its partner in the Newsweek/Daily Beast operation had pulled out.

At the end of 2012, the company discontinued the American print edition after 80 years of publication, citing the increasing difficulty of maintaining a paper weekly magazine in the face of declining advertising and subscription revenues and increasing costs for print production and distribution. The online edition is named Newsweek Global.

Spin-off to IBT Media, return to print (2013–2018)
In April 2013, IAC chairman and founder Barry Diller stated at the Milken Global Conference that he "wished he hadn't bought" Newsweek because his company had lost money on the magazine and called the purchase a "mistake" and a "fool's errand".

On August 3, 2013, IBT Media acquired Newsweek from IAC on terms that were not disclosed; the acquisition included the Newsweek brand and its online publication, but did not include The Daily Beast.

On March 7, 2014, IBT Media relaunched a print edition of Newsweek with a cover story on the alleged creator of Bitcoin, which was widely criticized for its lack of substantive evidence. The magazine stood by its story.

IBT Media announces that the publication returned to profitability on October 8, 2014.

In February 2017, IBT Media appointed Matt McAllester, then editor of Newsweek International, as global editor-in-chief of Newsweek.

In January 2018, Newsweek offices were raided by the Manhattan District Attorney's office as part of an investigation into co-owner and founder, Etienne Uzac. Columbia Journalism Review noted the probe "focused on loans the company took out to purchase the computer equipment", and several Newsweek reporters were fired after reporting on the issue. Uzac pleaded guilty to fraud and money-laundering in 2020.

Newsweek Publishing LLC (2018–present)

In September 2018, after completing the strategic structural changes introduced in March of the same year, IBT Media spun off Newsweek into its own entity, Newsweek Publishing LLC, with co-ownership to Dev Pragad and Johnathan Davis of IBT Media. Under current co-owner and CEO Dev Pragad, Newsweek has made improvements and the company is growing and profitable. According to a profile in Management Today, Dev Pragad has spent the past five years leading a remarkable transformation at Newsweek. Profits have been growing healthily since 2018, and the company is without debt for the first time in decades.

In 2020, Newsweek's website hit 100 million unique monthly readers, up from seven million at the start of 2017. In 2021, its revenues doubled to $60 million and traffic increased to 48 million monthly unique visitors in May 2022 from about 30 million in May 2019 according to Comscore. Dev Pragad was recently profiled in The CEO Magazine regarding the publications turnaround, which was also the subject of a Harvard Business School case study. The case focuses on the challenges Dev Pragad and Newsweeks digital transformation and the actions of its leadership team to turn it into a successful, long-term business.

Circulation and branches
In 2003, worldwide circulation was more than 4 million, including 2.7 million in the U.S; by 2010 it reduced to 1.5 million (with newsstand sales declining to just over 40,000 copies per week). Newsweek publishes editions in Japanese, Korean, Polish, Romanian, Spanish, Rioplatense Spanish, Arabic, Turkish, Serbian, as well as an English-language Newsweek International. Russian Newsweek, published since 2004, was shut in October 2010. The Bulletin (an Australian weekly until 2008) incorporated an international news section from Newsweek.

Based in New York City, the magazine claimed 22 bureaus in 2011: nine in the U.S.: New York City, Los Angeles, Chicago/Detroit, Dallas, Miami, Washington, D.C., Boston and San Francisco, and others overseas in London, Paris, Berlin, Moscow, Jerusalem, Baghdad, Tokyo, Hong Kong, Beijing, South Asia, Cape Town, Mexico City and Buenos Aires.

According to a 2015 column in the New York Post, after returning to print publication, Newsweek was selling c. 100,000 copies per month, with staff at that time numbering "about 60 editorial staffers", up from a low of "less than 30 editorial staffers" in 2013, but with plans then to grow the number to "close to 100 in the next year".

Controversies

Allegations of sexism
In 1970, Eleanor Holmes Norton represented sixty female employees of Newsweek who had filed a claim with the Equal Employment Opportunity Commission that Newsweek had a policy of allowing only men to be reporters. The women won, and Newsweek agreed to allow women to be reporters. The day the claim was filed, Newsweek cover article was "Women in Revolt", covering the feminist movement; the article was written by Helen Dudar, a freelancer, in the belief that there were no female writers at the magazine capable of handling the assignment. Those passed over included Elizabeth Peer, who had spent five years in Paris as a foreign correspondent.

The 1986 cover of Newsweek featured an article that said "women who weren't married by 40 had a better chance of being killed by a terrorist than of finding a husband". Newsweek eventually apologized for the story and in 2010 launched a study that discovered 2 in 3 women who were 40 and single in 1986 had married since.  The story caused a "wave of anxiety" and some "skepticism" amongst professional and highly educated women in the United States. The article was cited several times in the 1993 Hollywood film Sleepless in Seattle starring Tom Hanks and Meg Ryan. Comparisons have been made with this article and the current rising issues surrounding the social stigma of unwed women in Asia called sheng nu.

Former Alaska Governor and 2008 Republican vice presidential nominee Sarah Palin was featured on the cover of the November 23, 2009, issue of Newsweek, with the caption "How do you Solve a Problem Like Sarah?" featuring an image of Palin in athletic attire and posing. Palin herself, the Los Angeles Times and other commentators accused Newsweek of sexism for their choice of cover in the November 23, 2009 issue discussing Palin's book, Going Rogue: An American Life. "It's sexist as hell," wrote Lisa Richardson for the Los Angeles Times. Taylor Marsh of The Huffington Post called it "the worst case of pictorial sexism aimed at political character assassination ever done by a traditional media outlet". David Brody of CBN News stated: "This cover should be insulting to women politicians." The cover includes a photo of Palin used in the August 2009 issue of Runner's World.Clift, Eleanor. "Payback Time: Why Right-Wing Men Rush to Palin's Defense." Newsweek. Monday November 16, 2009. Retrieved January 27, 2010.  The photographer may have breached his contract with Runner's World when he permitted its use in Newsweek, as Runner's World maintained certain rights to the photo until August 2010. It is uncertain, however, whether this particular use of the photo was prohibited.

Minnesota Republican Congresswoman and presidential candidate Michele Bachmann was featured on the cover of Newsweek magazine in August 2011, dubbed "the Queen of Rage". The photo of her was perceived as unflattering, as it portrayed her with a wide eyed expression some said made her look "crazy". Conservative commentator Michelle Malkin called the depiction "sexist", and Sarah Palin denounced the publication. Newsweek defended the cover's depiction of her, saying its other photos of Bachmann showed similar intensity.

 Factual errors 
Unlike most large American magazines, Newsweek has not used fact-checkers since 1996. In 1997, the magazine was forced to recall several hundred thousand copies of a special issue called Your Child, which advised that infants as young as five months old could safely feed themselves zwieback toasts and chunks of raw carrot (to the contrary, both represent a choking hazard in children this young). The error was later attributed to a copy editor who was working on two stories at the same time.

In 2017, Newsweek published a story claiming that the First Lady of Poland refused to shake U.S. President Donald Trump's hand; Snopes described the assertion as "false". Newsweek corrected its story.

In 2018, Newsweek ran a story asserting that President Trump had wrongly colored the American flag while visiting a classroom; Snopes was unable to corroborate the photographic evidence.

In August 2018, Newsweek falsely reported that the Sweden Democrats, a far-right party, could win a majority in the 2018 Swedish parliamentary elections. Polls showed that the party was far away from winning a majority. By September 2018, Newsweek inaccurate article was still up.Newsweek journalists have expressed criticism of the editorial quality of its reporting since its change in ownership in 2013. In 2018, former Newsweek journalist Jonathan Alter wrote in The Atlantic that since being sold to the International Business Times in 2013 the magazine had "produced some strong journalism and plenty of clickbait before becoming a painful embarrassment to anyone who toiled there in its golden age". Former Newsweek writer Matthew Cooper criticized Newsweek for running multiple inaccurate stories in 2018.

In November 2022, during the Mahsa Amini protests in Iran, Newsweek incorrectly reported that Iran had ordered the execution of over 15,000 protesters. The claim was widely shared on social media, including by actresses Trudie Styler, Sophie Turner and Viola Davis, and Canadian prime minister Justin Trudeau. The number was actually derived from estimates from a United Nations human rights rapporteur and other human rights organizations of how many people were detained in Iran in connection with the protests, and Newsweek retracted the underlying claim leading to the inference that the people faced a death sentence.

 2018 investigation and firings 
The Manhattan District Attorney's office raided Newsweek's headquarters in Lower Manhattan on January 18, 2018, and seized 18 computer servers as part of an investigation related to the company's finances. IBT, which owned Newsweek at the time, had been under scrutiny for its ties to David Jang, a South Korean pastor and the leader of a Christian sect called "the Community".  In February 2018, under IBT ownership, several Newsweek staff were fired and some resigned stating that management had tried to interfere in articles about the investigations.

Other
Fareed Zakaria, a Newsweek columnist and editor of Newsweek International, attended a secret meeting on November 29, 2001, with a dozen policy makers, Middle East experts and members of influential policy research organizations that produced a report for President George W. Bush and his cabinet outlining a strategy for dealing with Afghanistan and the Middle East in the aftermath of September 11, 2001. The meeting was held at the request of Paul D. Wolfowitz, then the Deputy Secretary of Defense. The unusual presence of journalists, who also included Robert D. Kaplan of The Atlantic Monthly, at such a strategy meeting was revealed in Bob Woodward's 2006 book State of Denial: Bush at War, Part III. Woodward reported in his book that, according to Kaplan, everyone at the meeting signed confidentiality agreements not to discuss what happened. Zakaria told The New York Times that he attended the meeting for several hours but did not recall being told that a report for the president would be produced. On October 21, 2006, after verification, the Times published a correction that stated:
An article in Business Day on Oct. 9 about journalists who attended a secret meeting in November 2001 called by Paul D. Wolfowitz, then the deputy secretary of defense, referred incorrectly to the participation of Fareed Zakaria, the editor of Newsweek International and a Newsweek columnist. Mr. Zakaria was not told that the meeting would produce a report for the Bush administration, nor did his name appear on the report.

The cover story of the January 15, 2015, issue, titled "What Silicon Valley Thinks of Women" proved controversial, due to both its illustration, described as "the cartoon of a faceless female in spiky red heels, having her dress lifted up by a cursor arrow", and its content, described as "a 5,000-word article on the creepy, sexist culture of the tech industry". Among those offended by the cover were Today Show co-host Tamron Hall, who commented "I think it's obscene and just despicable, honestly." Newsweek editor-in-chief James Impoco explained "We came up with an image that we felt represented what that story said about Silicon Valley ... If people get angry, they should be angry." The article's author, Nina Burleigh, asked, "Where were all these offended people when women like Heidi Roizen published accounts of having a venture capitalist stick her hand in his pants under a table while a deal was being discussed?"

In January 1998, Newsweek reporter Michael Isikoff was the first reporter to investigate allegations of a sexual relationship between U.S. President Bill Clinton and Monica Lewinsky, but the editors spiked the story. The story soon surfaced online in the Drudge Report.

In the 2008 U.S. presidential election, the John McCain campaign wrote a lengthy letter to the editor criticizing a cover story in May 2008.

In December 2019, journalist Tareq Haddad said he resigned from Newsweek when it refused to publish his story about documents published by WikiLeaks concerning the Organisation for the Prohibition of Chemical Weapons' report into the 2018 Douma chemical attack. Haddad said his information was inconvenient to the U.S. government which had retaliated after the chemical attack. A Newsweek spokesperson responded that Haddad "pitched a conspiracy theory rather than an idea for objective reporting. Newsweek editors rejected the pitch."

In September 2022, Recorder published an investigation on press financing in Romania by the political parties in government. In the investigation, the director of Newsweek Romania(Sabin Orcan) has been accused of being paid 8000€ per month (3000€ by PSD and 5000€ by PNL) to publish positive news about the government. After the publication of the investigation, Newsweek Romania published a large series of articles to denigrate the Recorder investigation. Newsweek Romania is not owned by Newsweek Publishing but is a license of the brand platform 

Contributors and staff members

Notable contributors or employees have included:

 Shana Alexander
 Jonathan Alter
 David Ansen
 Pete Axthelm
 Maziar Bahari
 Paul Begala
 Arnold Beichman
 Peter Beinart
 Peter Benchley
 Lester Bernstein
 Ben Bradlee
 Dik Browne
 William Broyles Jr.
 Hal Bruno
 Eleanor Clift
 Arnaud de Borchgrave
 Kenneth G. Crawford
 Bill Downs
 Joshua DuBois
 Kurt Eichenwald
 Osborn Elliott
 Niall Ferguson
 Howard Fineman
 Nikki Finke
 Karl Fleming
 Lawrence Fried
 Milton Friedman
 David Frum
 Freeman Fulbright
 Robin Givhan
 Michelle Goldberg
 Meg Greenfield
 Josh Hammer
 Henry Hazlitt
 Wilder Hobson
 Robert Cunningham Humphreys
 Michael Isikoff
 Roger Kahn
 Jack Kroll
 Howard Kurtz
 Eli Lake
 John Lake
 Charles Lane
 John Lardner
 Robert K. Massie
 Jon Meacham
 Elizabeth Peer
 Lynn Povich
 Anna Quindlen
 Karl Rove
 Paul Samuelson
 Dick Schaap
 Allan Sloan
 Andrew Sullivan
 Ralph de Toledano
 Michael Tomasky
 Peter Turnley
 Margaret Warner
 Mark Whitaker
 George Will
 Elijah Wolfson
 Fareed Zakaria

Those who held the positions of president, chairman, or publisher under The Washington Post Company ownership include:
 Gibson McCabe
 Robert D. Campbell
 Peter A. Derow
 David Auchincloss
 Alan G. Spoon
Richard Mills Smith

See also

 List of magazines by circulation
 Newsweek Argentina Newsweek Pakistan Newsweek gay actor controversy
 Russky Newsweek''

References

External links

 
 Graham Holdings Company
 History and Demographics of Newsweek
 Newsweek Atlanta Bureau records at the Stuart A. Rose Manuscript, Archives, and Rare Book Library



 
1933 establishments in New York (state)
Magazines established in 1933
News magazines published in the United States
Weekly magazines published in the United States
Magazines published in New York City
Independent magazines
IBT Media
1961 mergers and acquisitions
2010 mergers and acquisitions
2013 mergers and acquisitions
Weekly news magazines